This is a list of episodes from the anime series Heat Guy J.The series originally aired on TBS in Japan from October 1, 2002 to March 25, 2003, and the first 13 episodes were later aired on MTV 2 in the United States. Each episode has two titles: one in English and one written in kanji. The opening theme is "Face" by Try Force.

References 

Heat Guy J